Brigid is a feminine given name, of which Bridget is a later variation.

Mythology
Brigid, goddess of pre-Christian Ireland

People
Brigid of Kildare (c. 451 – 525), Irish Christian Saint
Brigid Arthur (born 1934), Australian nun and litigation guardian
Brigid Balfour (1914–1994), British scientist
Brigid Bazlen (1944–1989), American actress
Brigid Berlin (1939–2020), American artist
Brigid Boden, Irish singer
Brigid Brannagh (born 1972), American actress
Brigid Brophy (1929–1995), British novelist
Brigid Dawson, American singer
Brigid Foley (1887–1970), Irish nationalist
Lady Brigid Guinness (1920–1995), Anglo-Irish wife of Prince Frederick of Prussia
Brigid Harrington (born 2000), American actress
Brigid Callahan Harrison (born 1965), American political scientist
Brigid Hogan (born 1943), British-American biologist
Brigid Hogan-O'Higgins (1932–2022), Irish politician
Brigid Hughes, American author
Brigid Keenan (born 1939), British writer born in India
Brigid Kosgei (born 1994), Kenyan marathon runner
Brigid Makowski (1937–2017), Irish politician
Brigid Lyons Thornton (1896–1987), Irish doctor and revolutionary
Brigid Tunney (1886–1975), Irish singer

See also
Brigid's cross

Feminine given names